The PolyU School of Design (also known as PolyU Design) is one of the eight schools and faculties of The Hong Kong Polytechnic University. The school was established in 1964 as a department in the Hong Kong Technical College. As of 2020, PolyU Design ranks 2nd in Asia and 15th in the world for art and design in QS World Rankings.

History 
First established in 1964 in the Hong Kong Technical College, general certificate courses were offered. In 1972, when the Hong Kong Polytechnic was formally established, it was renamed as the Department of Design, offering higher diploma courses. In 1980s, the department became the Swire School of Design, the school offered bachelor degrees. In 1994, when the polytechnic was granted university status, it became the PolyU School of Design, launching master degrees.

In 2013, the School of Design introduced the campus of the school, Jockey Club Innovation Tower, designed by Zaha Hadid.

Notable alumni 
 Raman Hui
 Kit Hung
 Gigi Leung
 Henry Lau
 Tony Leung
 Alice Mak
 Vivienne Tam
 Paul Wong
 Timmy Yip
 Kitty Yuen

See also 
 Hong Kong Polytechnic University
 Hong Kong Design Institute
 Savannah College of Art and Design, Hong Kong

References

External links 
 

Hong Kong Polytechnic University
Design schools
Art schools in Hong Kong